Eucalyptus buprestium, also known as the apple mallee or ball-fruited mallee, is a small mallee that is endemic to an area along the south coast of Western Australia. It has smooth bark, narrow lance-shaped adult leaves, flower buds arranged in groups of between nine and fifteen, white flowers and almost spherical fruit with a small opening.

Description
It has smooth greenish brown and cream-coloured bark that ages to grey and is shed in ribbons. Flowering occurs from September to December, sometimes as late as April and the flowers are white. November and April producing white flowers.

Taxonomy
Eucalyptus buprestium was first formally described by the botanist Ferdinand von Mueller in 1862 and the description was published in his book Fragmenta phytographiae Australiae. The specific epithet (buprestium) alludes to the beetle genus Bupestris, "referring to the attraction the mallees had for some beetles".

The species is part of the Eucalyptus subgenus series Diversiformae, a group of mallees that all have adult leaves held erect, buds with a single unscarred operculum and pyramidal seeds. The other species in this series include E. erectifolia, E. platydisca, E.diversifolia, E. todtiana, E. lateritica, E. dolorosa and E. pachyloma.

Distribution
Apple mallee is found on coastal and near-coastal sandplains and ridge tops along the south coast in the Great Southern region of Western Australia between Albany in the west, Mount Barker in the north and Jerramungup in the east where it grows in gravelly sandy-clay soils.

See also
List of Eucalyptus species

References

Eucalypts of Western Australia
Trees of Australia
buprestium
Myrtales of Australia
Plants described in 1862
Taxa named by Ferdinand von Mueller
Mallees (habit)